Werbe may refer to:

Werbe (Eder), a river of Hesse, Germany, tributary of the Edersee
Peter Werbe, American radio talk show host and anarchist
Nieder-Werbe and Ober-Werbe, two districts of the town Waldeck, Hesse, Germany